Tsujii (written: 辻井) is a Japanese surname. Notable people with the surname include:

, Japanese computer scientist
, Japanese pianist and composer
, Japanese writer and poet, pen-name of Tsutsumi Seiji, Japanese businessman

Japanese-language surnames